Nicholas Bloom  is the William Eberle Professor in the Department of Economics at Stanford University, a Courtesy Professor at Stanford Business School
and Stanford Institute for Economic Policy Research, and a Co-Director of the Productivity, Innovation and Entrepreneurship Program at the National Bureau of Economic Research.

He is a Fellow of the American Academy of Arts and Sciences and the Econometric Society, and the recipient of the Frisch Medal in 2010, the Bernacer Prize in 2012, the Center for Economic Studies Distinguished Fellow award in 2020, the Guggenheim Fellowship in 2022 and the 50 Most Influential (Bloomberg ranking) in 2022.

His research focuses on the measurement and impact of uncertainty on investment, employment and growth. He also works on the measurement of management practices and productivity with Raffaella Sadun and John Van Reenen, on working from home, and on innovation. He co-founded research websites on policy uncertainty, global uncertainty, UK uncertainty, management and working from home. 

He completed a PhD at University College London in 2001 under the supervision of John Van Reenen and Richard Blundell. From 1996 to 2002 he worked at the Institute for Fiscal Studies and on business tax policy at HM Treasury. From 2002 to 2003 he worked at McKinsey & Company, and in 2003 he moved to the Centre for Economic Performance at the London School of Economics, and to Stanford University in 2005.

He spoke on working from home at the 2014 White House Working Families Summit alongside Trade Unionists, Business Leaders, President Obama and Vice President Biden. , and at Tedx Stanford in 2017. His research on remote work has been cited and discussed in The New York Times and The Wall Street Journal.

References

External links
 Nicholas Bloom's page at Stanford University

Stanford University Department of Economics faculty
Stanford University Graduate School of Business faculty
Fellows of the Econometric Society
Fellows of the American Academy of Arts and Sciences
British economists
21st-century American economists
Alumni of Fitzwilliam College, Cambridge
Alumni of St Peter's College, Oxford
Alumni of University College London
1973 births
Living people